The Henry Champion House is a historic house on Westchester Road in Colchester, Connecticut.  Built in 1790, it is a good local example of Federal period architecture, designed by William Sprat, a prominent early architect.  It was built by Colonel Henry Champion, a veteran of the American Revolutionary War for his son, also named Henry.  The house was listed on the National Register of Historic Places in 1972.

Description and history
The Henry Champion House is located on the southern fringe of the village of Westchester in southwestern Colchester, on the west side of Westchester Road at its junction with Pickerel Lake Road.  It is a -story gambrel-roofed wood-frame structure, with a gambrel roof and clapboarded exterior.  Two brick chimneys are symmetrically placed in the interior, rising behind the main roof ridge.  Three gabled dormers project from the steep sloping front face of the roof, and the rear roof line slopes down to the first floor in a saltbox-like profile.  The main facade is five bays wide, with a center entrance flanked by sidelight windows and pilasters and sheltered by a gabled portico.  First-floor windows are topped by projecting cornices, and the main roof cornice has a line of dentil moulding.

The house was built in 1790 to a design by William Sprat, a Connecticut designer whose residential credits include houses in both Connecticut and Vermont.  The house was built by Colonel Henry Champion for his son, also named Henry.  Both Champions played an active role in the American Revolutionary War, and the younger Champion was a prominent local politician, serving in the state legislature.  He was also a major figure in the Connecticut Land Company, which undertook the settlement of parts of Upstate New York and Ohio.

See also
National Register of Historic Places listings in New London County, Connecticut

References

External links

Houses completed in 1790
Houses on the National Register of Historic Places in Connecticut
Historic American Buildings Survey in Connecticut
Houses in New London County, Connecticut
Georgian architecture in Connecticut
Federal architecture in Connecticut
Colchester, Connecticut
National Register of Historic Places in New London County, Connecticut